Gedser is a town at the southern tip of the Danish island of Falster in the Guldborgsund Municipality in Sjælland region. It is the southernmost town in Denmark, and also the southernmost point of Scandinavia and the Nordic countries. The town has a population of 657 (1 January 2022). It is an important port town on the Baltic Sea.

History

Overview
Gedser Church was designed by Peder Vilhelm Jensen-Klint and dates from 1915. 

Gedser was the first place German troops landed during the occupation of Denmark on April 9, 1940, at 3:55 in the morning. A number of armored cars and infantry troops hid in the ferry from Warnemünde, Rostock and advanced into the harbor as soon as the ship docked, soon after followed by another ferry.

Government
Until January 1, 2007, Gedser was a parish of the former municipality of Sydfalster (seat : Væggerløse) in Storstrøm County. In the Kommunalreformen ("The Municipality Reform" of 2007) that municipality merged with  Nykøbing Falster, Nysted, Nørre Alslev, Sakskøbing and Stubbekøbing to form Guldborgsund Municipality.

Museum
The local museum is Det Sorte Museum [The Black Museum], with elements of local geology, including Baltic amber, and occasional temporary exhibitions, such as dinosaurs.

Geography
Situated in the southernmost part of Denmark on the island of Falster, Gedser is a port town on the Baltic Sea. European route E55 (Helsingborg-Kalamata) passes through the town.

Gedser Odde is the southernmost point in Denmark.

Transportation
A car ferry route has operated from Gedser to Rostock in Germany since 1995, served by Scandlines. Formerly, there were also train and car ferry routes to Großenbrode (1951–1963) and Warnemünde (1903–1995) and a car ferry route to Travemünde (1963–1990), all in Germany. A bridge linking Gedser to Rostock was proposed, although a decision was made in 2007 to support a planned fixed link across the Fehmarn Belt to the west of Gedser instead.

Photogallery

References

External links

Cities and towns in Region Zealand
Port cities and towns in Denmark
Port cities and towns of the Baltic Sea
Falster
Denmark–Germany border crossings
Guldborgsund Municipality